Telent Technology Services Limited (styled as telent) is a British radio, telecommunications, and digital infrastructure systems installation and services provision company. The name was used from 2006 for those parts of the United Kingdom and German services businesses of Marconi Corporation (formerly General Electric Company, GEC) which had not been acquired by Ericsson. Companies with Marconi in their name can trace their ultimate origins, through mergers and takeovers, to The Marconi Company Ltd, founded by Guglielmo Marconi in 1897 as The Wireless Telegraph & Signal Company.

History 
The company's predecessor was formed in September 1961 as GEC Telecommunications Limited, a division of the GEC conglomerate. In 1988 the division became part of the GEC Plessey Telecommunications joint venture, and following the breakup of GPT during the 1990s it was renamed Marconi Communications Limited in 1998, when GEC decided to switch to use the better known Marconi brand name which it had owned for some time.

In January 2006, following Ericsson's acquisition of most Marconi assets, including the rights to the Marconi name, the remaining UK and German services business of Marconi Corporation which was not acquired and no longer had the rights to use the Marconi name was renamed Telent. In May 2007, Telent announced its move from Coventry to Warwick's Opus 40 business park.

In November 2007 Telent, which had inherited GEC's £2.5 billion pension scheme with several tens of thousands of members, was purchased by Pension Corporation for £400 million; the following month its shares were delisted and Telent became a private company.

In 2008 Telent made various acquisitions, including intelligent traffic systems group TSEU in March, leading communications infrastructure provider, the Alan Campbell Group, in July and telecoms service provider Premises Networks in September.

In September 2019 the pension scheme, described by Telent as a "disproportionately large liability", was bought out by Rothesay Life.

In September 2020, it was announced that Telent were awarded a contract with Openreach to support a £12 billion project for the UK's largest ultrafast broadband build, which would bring 'Full Fibre' broadband to thousands of homes and businesses.

Operations
The company provides a range of network and communications services to industries including Rail, Traffic, Public Safety, Defence, Service Providers, Enterprise and Public Sector. Products include enterprise software systems, emergency services communications and logistics, integrated warehouse logistics systems and rail and metro systems. Customers include BAE Systems, BT, Highways England, HM Coastguard, Interoute, London Ambulance Service, Merseyside Fire & Rescue, Metropolitan Police, Network Rail, RNLI, Sky, Transport for London, Virgin Media and Vodafone.

The company has many operational sites within the UK and Ireland, including at Chorley in Lancashire, Warwick, Camberley in Surrey, Harbour Exchange in London, and Dublin. A team of telecommunications technicians and engineers provide support and new features development for the TDM System X network used by BT, Virgin Media, Kingston Communications, Vodafone, and Gibtelecom.

People 

From its formation in 2006, Telent's CEO was Mark Plato. He died in a motorcycle accident in September 2019. Non-executive director Frank McKay, former CEO of Travis Perkins and Brakes Group, was appointed as his temporary replacement and was succeeded in July 2020 by Jo Gretton, a Telent executive since 2006.

See also 
Marconi Electronic Systems

References

Engineering companies of the United Kingdom
Computer companies of the United Kingdom
Telecommunications companies of the United Kingdom
Guglielmo Marconi
Companies formerly listed on the London Stock Exchange
Telecommunications companies established in 2006